Charango is the fourth studio album by the British group Morcheeba, released in the first week of July 2002 through Warner Bros. Records. It also appeared as a limited edition 2-CD version with a second CD containing instrumental versions of all the tracks. The album included a number of guest-appearances ranging from the singer Kurt Wagner, rapper Slick Rick, singer Miriam Stockley and bass guitar player Pino Palladino. The album became one of the most successful ones for the band, reaching the top ten in the UK charts.

The Japanese version includes a bonus track, "I'd Rather Kill Us (Than Watch You Leave)", also present on the "Way Beyond" single.

Track listing

Singles
Singles released included "Otherwise" and "Way Beyond". A limited edition 12" of a remixed "Women Lose Weight" was released in the UK and US. A planned third single "Undress Me Now" was abandoned despite the filming of a promotional video  for the song.

Charts

Weekly charts

Year-end charts

Certifications

References 

2002 albums
Morcheeba albums
Sire Records albums